Christopher "Mello" Melling (born 21 September 1984) is an English former professional rugby league footballer who played in the 2000s and 2010s.

Early career
Melling was born in Ashton-in-Makerfield, Greater Manchester, England. He was a pupil at Byrchall High School. 

played junior rugby league for the Ashton and Hindley junior clubs. Melling is a youth level international for England, touring Australia and New Zealand with England Under 16s in 2001 and also representing England's U18 Academy.

Wigan Warriors
Melling is a former Wigan Senior Academy captain who made several appearance for the Wigan first team.

In 2004's Super League IX it had seemed that Melling's career was in doubt following a serious knee injury suffered playing for Wigan against Leeds at Headingley. Melling had been seen as a future star before having his season ended by a cruciate ligament injury.

Upon his return to first team action in 2005's Super League X Chris made a further 10 first-grade appearances for the Wigan Warriors before picking up another knee injury requiring further surgery.

Melling returned to full fitness in 2006, but found first team opportunities limited, due to the emergence of Chris Ashton at the club.

He left Wigan to pursue regular first team rugby league.

Harlequins RL
Melling was initially signed as a back-up  to Chad Randall, however the Great Britain international made the  position his own. He has been compared to Wade McKinnon with the youngster being defensively solid and dependable, with an eye for a gap bringing the ball out in attack. His move to Harlequins was to have seen the youngster undergo a positional change with a move to hooker. He had been previously employed throughout the backline, with most of his first team appearances coming as an outside back.

In May 2007 Melling agreed to a new two-year deal with Harlequins Rugby League, midway through his first season at the Twickenham Stoop. This will keep Melling in the capital until 2009. He is seen as the emerging star at the Harlequins, with Harlequins RL investing in young British talent.

Representative football
He was joined in the Great Britain Test side by Harlequins teammate Paul Sykes. Melling made his Great Britain début in the 42-14 victory over the French on 22 June 2007, despite carrying an injury.

Away from football
Melling is a qualified Physiotherapist after studying at the University of Central Lancashire in Preston, graduating in June 2006. Melling hopes to set up his own physiotherapy practise in the future.

References

External links

!Great Britain Statistics at englandrl.co.uk (statistics currently missing due to not having appeared for both Great Britain, and England)
 Quins RL profile
Statistics at wigan.rlfans.com
(archived by web.archive.org) Always seems to be a lot of movement for the London club
(archived by web.archive.org) Wigan Player Profile
(archived by web.archive.org) Quins land young British trio
 Melling Kicks 10 goals
 Carney praises Wigan's young guns
 Profile at wigan-warriors.com

1984 births
Living people
English rugby league players
Great Britain national rugby league team players
London Broncos players
People from Ashton-in-Makerfield
Rugby league centres
Rugby league five-eighths
Rugby league fullbacks
Rugby league locks
Rugby league players from Wigan
Rugby league second-rows
Rugby league utility players
Rugby league wingers
Wigan Warriors players